Pauline Sieglinde Schäfer or Schäfer-Betz (born 4 January 1997) is a German artistic gymnast who represented Germany at the 2016 and 2020 Olympic Games. She is the 2017 World Champion, the 2021 World silver medalist, and the 2015 World bronze medalist on the balance beam. She was part of the bronze medal-winning German team at the 2022 European Championships.

Personal life 
Schäfer was born in 1997 in Saarbrücken, Saarland.  She has one younger sister Helene and two older brothers.  She began gymnastics at five years old at TV Pflugscheid-Hixberg. 
In 2012 she moved from Bierbach an der Blies to the boarding school Sportgymnasium Chemnitz.

Gymnastics career

2013
Schäfer turned senior in 2013 and made her international debut at the Cottbus World Cup in March.  During qualifications she placed nineteenth on balance beam and ninth on vault, making her the first reserve for the final.  Later that month she competed at the Chemnitz Friendly where she was on a mixed team with compatriot Carina Kröll and Americans Amelia Hundley and Brenna Dowell.  They finished fourth as a team.  In the all-around Schäfer finished in eighth place.  The following month Schäfer competed at the Ljubljana World Cup.  During qualifications she placed fourteenth on vault, twelfth on floor, and ninth on balance beam and therefore did not advance to any event finals.  In May she competed at her first German National Championships as a senior elite gymnast.  She finished fourth in the all-around behind Elisabeth Seitz, Lisa Katharina Hill, and Kim Bui.  During event finals she finished fourth on vault, third on balance beam, and sixth on floor exercise.  Schäfer competed at the 2013 World Championships but she did not qualify to any event finals.

2014
Schäfer started the season competing at a friendly competition in Munich where she helped Germany place second behind Great Britain.  Individually she placed sixth in the all-around.  She was later selected to compete at the European Championships alongside Kim Bui, Çağla Akyol, Sophie Scheder, and Janine Berger.  Together they finished fourth in the team final.  In August she competed at the German National Championships where she placed second in the all-around and on floor exercise behind Bui, first on vault and balance beam, and sixth on uneven bars.  The following month Schäfer competed at the Länderkampf Kunstturnen, a friendly competition, where Germany defeated Romania and Switzerland.  Individually Schäfer finished third in the all-around behind Larisa Iordache and Giulia Steingruber.

In October Schäfer represented Germany at the 2014 World Championships alongside Bui, Akyol, Lisa Katharina Hill, Elisabeth Seitz, and Scheder.  Together they finished ninth during qualifications and were the first reserve for the team final.  Although she didn't qualify for any individual finals, Schäfer successfully performed a new element, a sideways salto tucked with ½ turn (180°) take off from one leg to side stand, which was therefore named after her in the Code of Points.  In November Schäfer competed at the DTB Team Challenge where she helped Germany finish first as a team.  Individually she finished second on vault and floor exercise behind Ksenia Afanasyeva, fourth on uneven bars, but won gold on balance beam.  Schäfer ended the season competing at the Glasgow World Cup where she finished eighth.

2015

Schäfer began the season competing at the Cottbus World Cup where she only competed on balance beam and placed tenth in qualifications.  She was later selected to compete at the European Championships.  While there she qualified to the balance beam where she placed seventh in the final.  In May Schäfer competed at the Flanders International Team Challenge where she helped Germany place first as a team and individually she placed fifth in the all-around.  In September she competed at the German National Championships where she placed second in the all-around behind Elisabeth Seitz.  She placed first on vault and balance beam, fifth on floor exercise, and sixth on uneven bars. She next competed at the German World Trials where she placed third behind Seitz and Sophie Scheder.

Schäfer was selected to represent Germany at the World Championships alongside Seitz, Scheder, Leah Griesser, Lisa Katharina Hill, and Pauline Tratz.  During qualifications they placed twelfth and did not advance to the team final.  However Schäfer placed thirteenth in the all-around and eighth on balance beam and qualified to both finals.  During the all-around final Schäfer ended up placing nineteenth.  During the balance beam final Schäfer performed a clean routine and won the bronze medal behind Simone Biles and Sanne Wevers, Germany's first beam medal in over 30 years.  In November Schäfer competed at the Arthur Gander Memorial where she won the silver medal in three-event all-around behind Larisa Iordache.  She ended the season competing at the Swiss Cup, a mixed pairs event where she was partnered with Andreas Bretschneider.  Together they finished third behind the Ukrainian team of Angelina Kysla and Oleg Verniaiev and the Romanian team of Iordache and Marius Berbecar.

2016
In March Schäfer competed at the German National Team Cup where she finished first in the all-around. She next competed at the Stuttgart World Cup where she finished fifth after grabbing the beam.  In April she competed at the Olympic Test Event where she helped Germany place second behind Brazil and qualify a team to the Olympic Games.  Individually she placed sixth on balance beam and fifth on floor exercise.  In June Schäfer competed at the German National Championships where she placed third in the all-around behind Sophie Scheder and Elisabeth Seitz.  She won gold on both balance beam and floor exercise.  The following month she competed at the Olympic Trials where she placed fourth and was named to the team alongside Seitz, Scheder, Kim Bui, and Tabea Alt.  She next competed at a friendly competition in Chemnitz where Germany finished in first and individually Schäfer finished second behind Giulia Steingruber.

At the 2016 Olympic Games in Rio de Janeiro, during qualifications Schäfer competed on vault, balance beam, and floor exercise and helped Germany qualify to the team final for the first time since German reunification.  During the team final Schäfer once again contributed on vault, balance beam, and floor exercise towards Germany's sixth place finish.

2017
Schäfer competed at the German National Team Cup where she finished second behind Tabea Alt.  She next competed at the Stuttgart World Cup where she placed fourth behind Alt, Angelina Melnikova, and Morgan Hurd.  In April Schäfer competed at the European Championships alongside Alt, Elisabeth Seitz, and Kim Bui.  She qualified to the all-around and floor exercise finals.  In the all-around final she placed twentieth and in the floor exercise final she placed sixth behind Melnikova, Ellie Downie, Eythora Thorsdottir, Bui, and Lara Mori.  In June she competed at the German National Championships where she placed second in the all-around behind Seitz, fourth on uneven bars and balance beam, and won gold on floor exercise. In September she competed at the German World Trials where was named to the team alongside Bui, Seitz, and Alt.

At the World Championships Schäfer only competed on balance beam and floor exercise during qualifications.  She finished twenty-second on floor exercise but third on balance beam and therefore qualified to the event final alongside compatriot Alt.  During qualifications Schäfer was the only gymnast to receive an execution score higher than 8 on the balance beam.  During the event final Schäfer was once again the only gymnast to receive an execution score higher than 8 and she ended up winning the gold medal on the apparatus ahead of Hurd and Alt.  This was Germany's first women's gold medal at a World Championships since German reunification.  Schäfer ended the season competing at the Cottbus World Cup where she placed second on balance beam behind Wang Cenyu and third on floor exercise behind Lilia Akhaimova and Maria Kharenkova.

2018 
In June Schäfer competed at the German Euro Trials where she placed first in the all-around and received the highest scores on the balance beam and floor exercise.  She was named to the team alongside Kim Bui, Sarah Voss, Leah Griesser, and Emma Höfele.  The following month Schäfer competed at the Sainté Gym Cup where she placed third in the all-around behind Mélanie de Jesus dos Santos and Lorette Charpy.  Additionally Germany placed second behind France in the team competition.

At the European Championships Schäfer qualified to the balance beam final in second place behind Nina Derwael of Belgium.  The German team did not qualify to the team final after Griesser and Voss fell numerous times off of the balance beam.  During the balance beam final Schäfer fell off the apparatus while performing her eponymous skill and finished sixth.  In September Schäfer competed at the German World Trials where she only competed uneven bars, balance beam, and floor exercise – on which she had a bad fall and injured her ankle.  She recorded the highest balance beam score and second highest uneven bars scores of the competition.  Later that month Schäfer competed at the German National Championships but only competed on uneven bars due to her injury.  While she was in contention for the team to compete at the 2018 World Championships, Schäfer decided to withdraw due to her bone marrow edema holding her back from being able to compete at the necessary level for the World Championships.

2019
Schäfer returned to competition in March where she competed at the DTB Team Challenge but she only competed on vault and uneven bars.  In April she competed at the European Championships.  During qualifications she only competed on balance beam and uneven bars.  She qualified to the balance beam final in second place behind Giorgia Villa.  During event finals she fell off the apparatus and finished in sixth place.  In August she competed at the German National Championships where she placed sixth in the all-around and on floor exercise.  At the German World Trials Schäfer finished fourth in the all-around but posted the highest score on balance beam.  She next competed at a friendly competition in Worms, Germany where she finished eighth in the all-around but helped Germany finish first as a team.  Following the competition Schäfer was named as the alternate for the World Championships.

At the World Championships Sophie Scheder withdrew due to injury and Schäfer ended up competing in her place.  During qualifications Schäfer only competed on balance beam and helped Germany place ninth as a team.  Although they did not qualify to the team final, they qualified a team to the 2020 Olympic Games in Tokyo.

2021
On June 13 Schäfer was selected to represent Germany at the 2020 Summer Olympics alongside Elisabeth Seitz, Kim Bui, and Sarah Voss.  In qualifications at the Olympic Games Germany finished ninth as a team and did not advance to the finals.

Schäfer was selected as the sole representative to compete at the World Championships in Kitakyushu, Japan. She qualified third into the Balance Beam event final with a 13.733. She also competed floor and finished sixteenth with a 12.866.  During the balance beam final she won the silver medal behind Urara Ashikawa of Japan.  This was her third overall world medal on the apparatus.

2022
In June, Schäfer won the gold medal on the balance beam at the Osijek World Challenge Cup in Croatia. She went on to compete at the German Championships, where she won the gold in the balance beam final, and finished sixth in the floor final.

In August, Schäfer competed at the European Championships in Munich, where she helped Germany qualify to the team final in fourth place. Individually, she also qualified to the balance beam final. In the team final, the German team of Schäfer, Kim Bui, Emma Malewski, Sarah Voss and Elisabeth Seitz won the bronze medal behind Italy and Great Britain — Germany's first team medal in European Championship history. In the beam final, Schäfer finished fifth with a score of 13.200.

Eponymous skill
Schäfer has one eponymous skill listed in the Code of Points.

Competitive history

References

External links
 
 
 
 Pauline Schäfer on the Turn-Team Deutschland website

1997 births
Living people
German female artistic gymnasts
Gymnasts at the 2016 Summer Olympics
Medalists at the World Artistic Gymnastics Championships
Olympic gymnasts of Germany
Sportspeople from Saarbrücken
World champion gymnasts
Originators of elements in artistic gymnastics
Gymnasts at the 2020 Summer Olympics